Chatrapathi is a 2013 Indian Kannada-language action film directed and produced by Dinesh Gandhi. It stars Dr. Siddhanth, Priyadarshini, and Bhanupriya in the main lead. The film is a remake of Telugu film of the same name, which starred Prabhas and Shriya Saran. M. M. Keeravani, the composer of the original version recreates his compositions in Kannada version.

Plot
Sivaji and Ashok are the sons of Parvati. Sivaji is her stepson, but Parvati shows equal affection for both of them. This is not liked by Ashok, her biological son. They are one of the families living on the coast of Sri Lanka. One day, these villagers are forced to evacuate the coast. By Ashok's dislike on Sivaji, he lies to his mother that Sivaji died in the fire that was burning everything. Then, he is separated from his family. He ends up in a different boat and lands in Vizag port. He is brought up in the port itself, but his search for his mother never ceases. In that process, he comes across Neelu. Here, the port is dominated by Baji Rao and some goons using refugee labor for their own gain. Sivaji is an aggressive guy but is controlled by his well-wishers. One day, he reacts aggressively in defense of himself and the other refugees. People start calling him Chhatrapati. Meanwhile, Ras Bihari comes down to Vizag in the hunt for Sivaji since he killed his brother Baji Rao. Ashok, too lands in the same place. Realizing that Sivaji is his brother, he joins hands with the bad guys. The story is then of Chhatrapati, who is searching for his mother, and has a bunch of bad guys, including his brother, on his back while the entire port looks up to him.

Cast
Siddhanth as Shivaji aka Shivu 
 Priyadarshini
 Bhanupriya as Shivaji's step-mother
 Rachana Maurya
 Mithra
 Dilip 
 Harry Jose (Mumbai)
 Khetan 
 Honnavalli Krishna

Soundtrack

Reception

Critical response 

A critic from The Times of India scored the film at 2 out of 5 stars and says "Siddhanth has a long way to go to prove his mettle as an actor. Priyadarshini is not used well. While Bhanumathi has done a good job, Mitra’s comic avatar is a disaster. The less said the better about the rest". B S Srivani from Deccan Herald wrote "But the one who steals the show is Jaidev, with his mean streak making the role interesting. Sadly, the director’s ineptitude doesn’t help the film’s cause.But Manju’s fans can rejoice for the slick, violent fight pieces. Elsewhere, this Chatrapathi stumbles bad".

References

2013 films
2010s Kannada-language films
Films scored by Rajesh Ramnath
Films scored by M. M. Keeravani
Indian action films
Kannada remakes of Telugu films
Indian gangster films
2013 action films